The 1931 Upper Hunter state by-election was held on 7 October 1939 for the New South Wales Legislative Assembly electorate of Upper Hunter because of the death of William Cameron. The Country Party did not nominate an official candidate because the seat had been held by the Nationalist Party. Malcolm Brown was nominated as an independent country candidate, and was supported in his campaign by the leader of the Country Party, Michael Bruxner.

Dates

Results

William Cameron died.Malcom Brown won the seat on Labor preferences, and joined the Country Party once he entered Parliament.

See also
Electoral results for the district of Upper Hunter
List of New South Wales state by-elections

Notes

References

Upper Hunter
New South Wales state by-elections
1930s in New South Wales